Karukinka Natural Park is a private natural park located in the Chilean portion of the Isla Grande de Tierra del Fuego. The lands for the park were donated to the Wildlife Conservation Society by Goldman Sachs.

References
Official site
Goldman Sachs Announces Transfer of Unique Chilean Wilderness to WCS

Goldman Sachs
Protected areas of Magallanes Region
Parks in Chile
Tierra del Fuego Province, Chile